is a strait between Awaji Island and Shikoku in Japan. It connects Harima Nada, the eastern part of the Inland Sea and the Kii Channel. A famous feature of the strait is the Naruto whirlpools. Ōnaruto Bridge, the southern part of the Kobe-Awaji-Naruto Expressway, crosses over it.

External links

Interactive satellite photos of the site

Straits of Japan
Tourist attractions in Hyōgo Prefecture
Landforms of Hyōgo Prefecture